Sally Le Page is a British evolutionary biologist and science communicator. She is best known for making educational science content on YouTube, both for her own channel and for collaborations with groups such as General Electric and Rooster Teeth. She completed her PhD at the University of Oxford researching sexual selection.

Education 
Le Page attended King's High, Warwick. She studied biology at the University of Oxford starting in 2010, and graduated with a first-class Bachelor of Arts degree in 2013.

Research 
Le Page completed her PhD at the University of Oxford researching sexual selection. Her research focussed on using Drosophila melanogaster to understand evolutionary theory. She found that if brothers grew up in the same environment as larvae they are less harmful to female fruit flies. Her research was covered in American Association for the Advancement of Science's Eureka Alert and on Oxford Sparks.

Public engagement 
In 2013 Le Page won The Guardian and Oxford University Press Very Short Film competition. She is the science correspondent on Rooster Teeth. She won Science Slam in Oxford in 2013. Since 2012, Le Page has created videos for her own science YouTube channel Shed Science, which has over 50,000 subscribers, and where she publishes science videos, vlogs and interviews other science communicators. In 2014 she performed at the Royal Institution. In 2015 she became the General Electric Creator in Residence. She joined them at South by Southwest, where she discussed the neuroscience of taste. In 2017 she was invited by BNP Paribas Foundation to make a science video studying coral reefs in Polynesia, and later in the year criticized UK water suppliers for their use of dowsing to find water.
Le Page is a campaigner for LGBT equality and queer visibility in STEM.

References

External links 

 

Alumni of the University of Oxford
English YouTubers
LGBT YouTubers
Women evolutionary biologists
English biologists
English women scientists
English LGBT scientists
Science communicators
21st-century English scientists
21st-century biologists
21st-century British women scientists
Living people
Date of birth missing (living people)
Rooster Teeth people
Year of birth missing (living people)
21st-century British screenwriters
21st-century English women
20th-century English women
20th-century English people
20th-century English LGBT people
21st-century English LGBT people